Many sub-national governments have a Department of Environmental Management or similarly named organization:

United States
 Alabama Department of Environmental Management
 Indiana Department of Environmental Management
 Massachusetts Department of Environmental Management, now part of the Department of Conservation and Recreation (Massachusetts)
 Rhode Island Department of Environmental Management

See also
 Department of Environmental Protection (disambiguation)
 Department of Natural Resources (disambiguation)
 List of environmental agencies in the United States